Montaldo Roero is a comune (municipality) in the Province of Cuneo in the Italian region Piedmont, located about  southeast of Turin and about  northeast of Cuneo.

Montaldo Roero borders the following municipalities: Baldissero d'Alba, Ceresole Alba, Corneliano d'Alba, Monteu Roero, and Vezza d'Alba.

References 

Cities and towns in Piedmont
Roero